Danny Nordahl is a bass guitarist who currently plays in the bands Faster Pussycat and Motochrist.

He has also played in the bands The Throbs.., Stiv Bators And His Evil Boys, N.Y. Loose, The Newlydeads, Tracii Guns' version of L.A. Guns, and Hollywood Roses.

Discography

With Stiv Bators And His Evil Boys
 Live At The Limelight (1989)

With The Throbs
 The Language of Thieves and Vagabonds (1991)

With N.Y. Loose
 Trash The Given Chance (1995) 
 Loosen Up! (1995) 
 Year of the Rat (1996) 
 The Crow: City of Angels (soundtrack) (1996)

With The Newlydeads
 Dead End (2001)

With Faster Pussycat
 The Power and the Glory Hole (2006)
 Front Row for the Donkey Show (2009)

With Motochrist
 666-Pack (2000) 
 Greetings From The Bonneville Salt Flats (2003)
 Hollywood High (live) (2006)
 Corvette Summer (2010)
 Chrome (2015)

With Hollywood Roses
 Dopesnake (2007)

With L.A. Guns
 Acoustic Gypsy Live (2011)

References

American bass guitarists
The Newlydeads members
Faster Pussycat members
L.A. Guns members
Living people
Year of birth missing (living people)